The 1972 La Flèche Wallonne was the 36th edition of La Flèche Wallonne cycle race and was held on 23 April 1972. The race started in Verviers and finished in Marcinelle. The race was won by Eddy Merckx of the Molteni team.

General classification

References

1972 in road cycling
1972
1972 in Belgian sport
1972 Super Prestige Pernod